Vicarious is the fourth studio album by New Zealand band Strawpeople, featuring vocalist Fiona McDonald. Released in 1996 by Columbia Records, the electronic album produced by McDonald and Strawpeople member Paul Casserly was commercially successful, staying on the New Zealand charts for nearly six months and peaking at #4. It was also awarded Album of the Year at the 1997 New Zealand Music Awards.

Development 
The album was originally intended to feature Victoria Kelly as the vocalist and her and Casserly began writing songs together. However, she left New Zealand to study at a music school in the United States early in the album's development. This resulted in McDonald, a singer previously featured on Strawpeople tracks who was searching for a new musical project, being selected as the new vocalist. Casserly and McDonald wrote the songs for the album in McDonald's spare room at her Grey Lynn home as well as in  Casserly's lounge. Kelly, Jeremy Morrow, Greg Johnson, and Mark Tierney (former member of Strawpeople who left the band in February 1996) are also credited as songwriters throughout the album. The album was then recorded at The Lab Studios in Auckland and mixed at Studios 301 in Sydney.

Composition 
Vicarious is distinct compared to other releases by Strawpeople, which contain numerous different vocalists and a number of covers. Comparatively, the album is absent of covers and McDonald is the sole vocalist. Casserly has stated that the album lacked cover songs as the band "realised that [their] own songs were doing better than the covers," referring to the success of their original songs from previous albums such as "Sweet Disorder" and "Trick With A Knife," the latter song reaching the top 40 in Australia. However, by the band's next studio album, 2000's No New Messages, they had returned to a mixture of covers and original material.

Singles 
Three singles were released from Vicarious. The first, "Taller Than God," spent 9 weeks on the New Zealand charts and reached #19. The next two singles, "Boxers" and "Spoiler," reached the charts but were less successful, peaking at #44 and #47 respectively. Two of the singles earned nominations at the New Zealand Music Awards: "Taller Than God" was nominated for Single of the Year and "Boxers" was nominated for Best Songwriter.

Track listing 

Sources: Spotify and CD liner.

Personnel 

 Paul Casserly – production, programming, instrumentation
 Fiona McDonald – vocals, production, programming, instrumentation
 Jeremy Allom – mixing
 Trent Williamson  – mixing assistance
 Steve Smart – mastering
 Victoria Kelly – instrumentation (tracks 2-3), string arrangements (tracks 1, 4, 7, 10)
 Mark Tierney – instrumentation (tracks 2-3)
 Jeremy Morrow – programming, production (track 9)
 Greg Johnson – trumpet (tracks 3, 5)
 Andrew McLaren – percussion (tracks 1, 4, 11)

 Chris Van de Geer – guitar (track 11)
 Chris Matthews – guitar (tracks 4, 11)
 Steve Harrop – double bass (track 5)
 Jane Cooper – cello
 Nigel Keay – viola
 Miranda Adams – violin
 Matt Fields – double bass
 Jocelyn Healy – violin
 Katherine Hebley – cello

Source: CD liner.

Charts

Weekly charts

Year-end charts

References 

1996 albums
Electronic albums by New Zealand artists